delta-Octalactone is a lactone and aroma compound with a creamy cocoa, coconut, and peach flavor. Its chemical formula is C8H14O2.

References 

Lactones